Poomagal Oorvalam is a 1999 Indian Tamil-language romantic drama film written and directed by Rasu Madhuravan. The film stars Prashanth and Rambha. The film's score and soundtrack are composed by Siva. The film released on 30 April 1999. It received mixed reviews and became a commercial success.

Plot 
Saravanan, orphaned by his dead mother – a mental patient, is adopted by a childless couple. Theirs is an inter-caste marriage. At college, he runs into Kavitha, the granddaughter of caste-obsessed Sengodan. The triangle is completed by Aavudayappan alias Armstrong, a US-return who is smitten by Kavitha.

With a little unintentional photo-swapping by the marriage broker, the parents of Saravanan and Aavudayappan (the fathers have the same name) both think they have an alliance for their son with Sengodan's family and show up at Kavitha's house at the same time. Romance flowers between Saravanan and Kavitha, who assume they are going to wed, while Aavudayappan continues to dream of Kavitha.

A series of contrivances allow this comedy of errors to carry on till the engagement where the announcement of the groom's name causes all sorts of confusions. Sengodan is now against the Saravanan-Kavitha union since Saravanan's parents are of different castes. Things come to a dramatic conclusion when Sengodan realises that Saravanan is indeed his own grandson, with a brief flashback relating to Boopathy  – Vasanthi marriage split due to her illness. The film ends with Saravanan and Kavitha marrying each other.

Cast 
Prashanth as Saravanan
Livingston as Aavudayappan (Armstrong)
Rambha as Kavitha
Manivannan as Chidambaram , Saravanan's adoptive father
Radha Ravi as Chidambaram
Rajan P. Dev as Sengodan
Nizhalgal Ravi as Boopathy
Raadhika as Lakshmi, Saravanan's adoptive mother
Vivek as Sakthi
Vaiyapuri as Muniyandi
Ponvannan as Gangadharan , Kavitha's father
Pandu as Broker Ponnusamy
Sathyapriya as Meenakshi
Halwa Vasu as Murugesan
Anju as Vasanthi ,Saravanan's  mother
Mahendran as Young Saravanan
Hemalatha as Ragini ,(Child artist)

Production 
It was reported that the actor Prashanth was badly hurt on his face, while he took part in a stunt scene.  A sharp iron rod hit him on his face and he was hurt on his left cheek and immediately had three stitches on this wound from a local hospital. Further reports claimed that he was set to travel to London to partake in cosmetic surgery to avoid scarring. The issue was later reported to be exaggerated, with Prashanth citing that he had a minor injury and that the media blew the incident out of proportion.

Soundtrack 
The film score and the soundtrack were composed by Siva. The soundtrack, released in 1999, features 6 tracks.

Reception 
K. N. Vijiyan of New Straits Times gave the film a mixed review. D. S. Ramanujam from The Hindu wrote: "Fun-laden situations and humor course along at a brisk pace in Supergood Films’ Poomagal Oorvalam. Debutant director Mathuravan, who has written the story, dialogue and screenplay, structures his narration in an enjoyable way. For Prasanth, the hero, it is another proof of his caliber, be it pouring out emotions, without overdoing it, carrying with subtlety the lighter moments or dancing comfortably". Sandya Krishnan from Indolink wrote, "Watch it for the comedy, if not for anything else".

References

External links 
 

1999 romantic comedy-drama films
1990s Tamil-language films
1999 directorial debut films
1999 films
Films directed by Rasu Madhuravan
Indian romantic comedy-drama films
Super Good Films films